The mainstream river snail, also known as the onyx rocksnail, scientific name Leptoxis praerosa, is a species of freshwater snail with a gill and an operculum, an aquatic gastropod mollusk in the family Pleuroceridae. This species is endemic to the United States.

References

Molluscs of the United States
Leptoxis
Gastropods described in 1821
Taxonomy articles created by Polbot